Trion may refer to:
Trion, Georgia, a town in Chattooga County, Georgia, United States
Alpha Trion, the name of several fictional characters in the various Transformers universes
Trion (neural networks), a localized group of neurons in the cortex and a basic unit in the trion model
Trion (physics), a quasiparticle in a solid
Trion Worlds, a video game developer and publisher
Trion Supercars, an American car manufacturer